Rónald Paolo Montero Iglesias (born 3 September 1971) is a Uruguayan football manager and former player, who played as a central defender or left-back and is the manager of Primavera 1 team Juventus U19.

Montero began his career in Uruguay with Peñarol in 1990, before moving to Italian side Atalanta in 1992. He joined Juventus in 1996, where he remained until 2005, winning four Serie A titles, among other trophies; he subsequently moved to Argentine club San Lorenzo. In 2006, he transferred back to Peñarol, where he retired in 2007. At international level, he represented the Uruguay national football team at the 1997 FIFA Confederations Cup, at the 2002 FIFA World Cup, and at the 2004 Copa América.

Club career

Peñarol
Montero was born in Montevideo, Uruguay, into a footballing family; his father is former Uruguay international Julio Montero Castillo. As a child, Paolo had to maintain good grades at school, otherwise his father would not allow to him to attend football practice. As a professional, Montero started his career for C.A. Peñarol in 1990 and remained with the club for 2 seasons, making 34 appearances and scoring one goal, before transferring to Atalanta B.C. in the Italian Serie A in 1992.

Atalanta
After transferring to the Bergamo-based club, Montero became an instant fixture in the club's starting eleven, and was a key member of their defense. He managed 27 league appearances and two goals in his debut Serie A season. In his second season with the club, he managed 30 starts, however the club's season ended in relegation to Serie B. In the second division, Montero appeared in 34 games, scoring two goals, helping his team to immediate promotion back to Serie A. During the 1995–1996 Serie A season, Montero struggled with injuries, only making 23 appearances. After impressing greatly during his four-year stay in Bergamo, Montero made the highly anticipated switch to the Italian and European powerhouse, Juventus F.C.

Juventus
Following the big switch to Turin in 1996, Montero made over 30 appearances in his first season with Juventus in all competitions. It was here, even after an impressive first season, that he achieved great success, winning four scudetti with the club, along with other honours; Montero also won three Italian Supercups, and reached three Champions League finals and two Coppa Italia finals with the club during this period. Montero was believed to have been the best friend of Zinedine Zidane during the pair's time together at Juventus, which ended when Zidane was sold to Real Madrid in 2001.
Juventus were extremely dominant both domestically and internationally during this period, and had what was considered to be the best defense in the world at the time, and teams strongly regretted ever going down a goal to the club, as they knew how hard it would be to score one back for themselves. Montero played at both center back and left back during this period, forming impressive defensive partnerships with the likes of Ciro Ferrara, Mark Iuliano, Gianluca Pessotto, Lilian Thuram, Alessandro Birindelli, Igor Tudor, Gianluca Zambrotta, Nicola Legrottaglie, and Fabio Cannavaro during his ten-year tenure with the club. After the 2004–05 Serie A triumph, Montero and teammate Ferrara called it quits on their Juventus careers. The Uruguayan opted to return to South America, while Ferrara retired. Montero made over 200 appearances for i bianconeri, scoring one league goal. In the 2003 UEFA Champions League Final, Montero was one of the three Juventus players to have their penalty saved by A.C. Milan keeper Dida in the shootout defeat. With his three Champions League final defeats, Montero is the player with the most Champions League final appearances not to win a Champions League medal, alongside former Juventus teammates Alessio Tacchinardi and Gianluigi Buffon.

San Lorenzo
After his tenure at Juventus, Montero moved to Argentinian club San Lorenzo. His time at the club was short-lived however, as he constantly missed games due to injuries. He left the club after just 14 appearances and scored one goal against Racing Club de Avellaneda. In 2006, offers came in from clubs such as Olympiakos and newly promoted Serie A club Catania; however, Montero chose to return to his childhood club where he began his career, C.A. Peñarol.

Return to Peñarol
For the 2006–07 season, Montero re-joined former club Peñarol, for one last season prior to officially announcing his retirement. He scored one goal in 26 matches during his last season as a professional footballer.

International career
An important member of the Uruguayan national side, Montero first represented his team in an international tournament at the 1997 FIFA Confederations Cup, finishing in fourth place. He had previously played for the Uruguay U-20 side in the 1991 Under-20 World Championship. He also appeared for the senior side in the 2002 World Cup, after helping his side to qualify for the tournament, where the talented Uruguayan squad were disappointingly eliminated in the group stage. In the 2004 Copa América, Montero and Uruguay reached the semi-finals, finishing the tournament in third place. Montero also captained his country in their bid to qualify for the 2006 FIFA World Cup in an intercontinental playoff against Australia, the country the Uruguayans defeated by a very convincing margin of 3–0 to qualify for the 2002 FIFA World Cup tournament four years before. Sadly for Montero, he limped off with a hamstring injury during the second game in Sydney, and later Australia went on to narrowly snatch the win and the World cup qualification via penalties. After the defeat, Montero immediately announced his international retirement, saying "what happened today was such a pity as this group of players deserved to be at the World Cup finals." Montero made over 60 appearances for his country in between 1991 and 2006, scoring 5 goals.

Retirement
Paolo Montero reportedly retired in late May 2007 after attending a team training session in order to say goodbye to his teammates. His current squad had tried to persuade him to come back to football, with teammate Rubén Capria saying that "it's a tough blow to lose our captain".

He played his final match in what was also Marcelo Salas' farewell match, a former Juventus teammate of Montero's.

In August 2019, Montero enrolled in the UEFA Pro Licence courses at Coverciano.

Style of play
Considered to be one of the best defenders of his time, and one of Juventus's greatest ever centre-backs, Montero has been described as "skilful on the ball and calm under pressure", and a "wonderfully talented and intelligent footballer". In his prime he was regarded as one of the best defenders in the world. His international reputation is one of a man who was "fearsome, immovable and essential, in a back line that conquered Italy and Europe". A versatile defender, he was capable of playing in the centre (both as a stopper or as a sweeper) or on the left (although this was not his favoured position), and was known for his strength, consistency, leadership and organisational skills. Montero also stood out during his career due to his aerial ability, timing, technical ability, and distribution.

A combative, tenacious, complete, and talented defender, he was also frequently criticised for his aggression and hard tackling playing style throughout his career, as well as his knack for picking up unnecessary bookings. He holds the record for the most red cards received by a player in Serie A history, being sent off 16 times, and was sent off a total of 21 times throughout his career. In 2007, The Times placed him at number 39 in their list of the 50 hardest footballers in history. Welsh former winger Ryan Giggs described Montero and his defensive teammate at Juventus Ciro Ferrara as "...the toughest defenders [he] played against", also adding that they were often very hard in their challenges.

Managerial career
After retirement, Montero embarked on a career as manager, working in his native Uruguay with Peñarol and Boca Unidos, and in Argentina with Colón de Santa Fe and Rosario Central.

On 6 June 2019 he returned in Italy, being unveiled as new head coach of Serie C club Sambenedettese for the club's 2019–20 season. He was sacked on 27 October 2020 after a string of defeats in the 2020–21 Serie C season. He was reinstated as Sambenedettese head coach on 11 February 2021, following the resignations of Mauro Zironelli. On 28 June 2022, Montero became Juventus U19's — a youth team of Juventus, his former team — coach.

Career statistics

Club

1 Including 1 match in 1996 Intercontinental Cup and 1 match in 1996 UEFA Super Cup.
2 Including 1 match in 1997 Supercoppa Italiana.
3 Including 2 matches in season 1998–99 UEFA Cup qualification.
4 Including 1 match in 2002 Supercoppa Italiana.

International
Source:

International goals

Managerial

Honours

Club
Juventus
Serie A (4): 1996–97, 1997–98, 2001–02, 2002–03
Supercoppa Italiana (3): 1997, 2002, 2003
UEFA Super Cup (1): 1996
Intercontinental Cup (1): 1996
UEFA Intertoto Cup (1): 1999

References

External links
International statistics at rsssf

 
 
 

1971 births
Living people
Association football central defenders
Peñarol players
Atalanta B.C. players
Juventus F.C. players
San Lorenzo de Almagro footballers
Expatriate footballers in Argentina
Expatriate footballers in Italy
Uruguayan expatriate footballers
Uruguayan expatriate sportspeople in Argentina
Uruguayan expatriate sportspeople in Italy
Uruguayan footballers
Uruguayan people of Spanish descent
Uruguayan people of Italian descent
Uruguayan Primera División players
Argentine Primera División players
Serie A players
Serie B players
Uruguay under-20 international footballers
Uruguay international footballers
1997 FIFA Confederations Cup players
2002 FIFA World Cup players
2004 Copa América players
Peñarol managers
Rosario Central managers
Uruguayan football managers